The 2008–09 Romanian Hockey League season was the 79th season of the Romanian Hockey League. Five teams participated in the league, and SC Miercurea Ciuc won the championship.

First round

Final round

Playoffs

Final
SC Miercurea Ciuc - HC Miercurea Ciuc 6-4, 3-1, 3-5, 3-2, 3-2

3rd place
CSA Steaua Bucuresti - SCM Braşov 8-7 OT, 7-2, 1-5, 3-1

Relegation
Progym Gheorgheni - Sportul Studențesc Bucharest 1-4, 4-2, 4-2, 12-4, 6-4

External links
Season on hockeyarchives.info

Romanian Hockey League seasons
Romanian 
Rom